Kirby's Pinball Land is a 1993 pinball video game developed by HAL Laboratory and published by Nintendo for the Game Boy.  It was HAL Laboratory's third pinball video game after the MSX and NES title Rollerball and the Game Boy title Revenge of the 'Gator. It was also the first spin-off and second Game Boy title in the Kirby series, as well as the second pinball video game Nintendo published after the NES title Pinball. The game was rereleased on the Nintendo 3DS Virtual Console service in July 2012.

The game stars Kirby as the ball, while it features three pinball tables, each owned by a classic boss of the Kirby series: Whispy Woods, Kracko, and Poppy Bros. Sr.

Gameplay
The game is played much like that of pinball, with two flippers used to help keep Kirby in play as he bounces off walls, bumpers and enemies, scoring points by doing so. Defeating certain enemies earns bonus points and multipliers, which combine to provide a bonus at the end of each life. Players can also earn Maxim Tomatoes which help block the drain for a short period. The game is made up of three tables; Whispy Woods, Kracko and Poppy Bros, each made up of three floors. The aim of the game to help Kirby make his way up to the top floor in order to access each table's boss.

Each floor has various gimmicks that either help Kirby to reach the next floor, such as characters which throw Kirby upwards, or bring in a Warp Star that Kirby can hop onto. Warp Stars on the bottom floor take Kirby to the table selection screen, Warp Stars on the middle floor takes Kirby to a minigame, where he can earn extra points and multipliers, and Warp Stars on the top floor take Kirby to that table's boss fight. Each boss fight requires the player to deal a certain number of hits to the boss without hitting the Warp Star at the bottom and returning to the top screen. After defeating all three bosses, players then fight against King Dedede. After defeating Dedede, the player can play the three tables again to aim for a higher score.

If Kirby falls down the drain on the bottom floor of each table, he will land on a springboard. By timing the A button at the moment where the springboard is at its lowest, Kirby can spring back up to the table, with well timed presses returning him to the top floor. However, the springboard becomes smaller with each use, making it more difficult to successfully spring back up. If Kirby fails to jump back into the table, the player will lose a life, with the game ending once the player has run out of lives. Extra lives can be earned by spelling out the word 'Extra' with letters that appear on the table selection screen after bosses have been defeated.

Reception

In the United Kingdom, it was the top-selling Game Boy game for two months in 1994, from March to April.

Kirby's Pinball Land was met mostly positive reception. Electronic Gaming Monthly gave it a 7.25 out of 10. They criticized that the blurring of the Game Boy screen makes it difficult to see what's going on, but nonetheless deemed it "one of the better pinball games for any system" due to the ability to recover lost balls, the multi-table gameplay, and the large number of hidden things to find. Nintendo Power ranked Kirby’s pinball Land the fifth best Game Boy game of 1993.

Retrospective

Retrospectively, it holds an average score of 70% at GameRankings. In a retrospective review, IGN praised it as a quality Game Boy pinball game, describing it as being both involving and fun. Kirby's Pinball Land was one of the nominees for IGN's "Game Boy Action Game of the Century" Reader's Choice award. 1UP.com commented that "Spin-offs are a groan-inducing inevitability for popular series, but Kirby's Pinball Land is one of those ideas that just make good sense." The engine used in Kirby's Pinball Land would later be used in another Nintendo game, Pokémon Pinball. Super Gamer Magazine gave the Game an overall review score of 85% writing: "Highly playable pinball game with loads of levels and bonuses.  Screen blurs slightly, but this doesn’t make it any less fun."

Notes

References

External links 

HAL Laboratory games
Kirby (series) video games
Pinball video games
Game Boy games
Video games developed in Japan
Virtual Console games
Virtual Console games for Nintendo 3DS
1993 video games
Video games directed by Masahiro Sakurai
Video games scored by Tadashi Ikegami